Pernagera gatliffi is a species of small air-breathing land snails, terrestrial pulmonate gastropod mollusks in the family Charopidae. This species is endemic to Australia.

References

Gastropods of Australia
Gatliffi
Vulnerable fauna of Australia
Gastropods described in 1930
Taxonomy articles created by Polbot